The Diting (Vietnamese: Đế Thính) is a divine mythical creature and the steed of bodhisattva Kṣitigarbha in Chinese Buddhism. One interpretation of its single horn was that it could receive information across the universe. It could also be used to attack and defend. Its hound ears were like a universal radio, transmitting the ability to distinguish good from bad to all believers.

Body
The Diting combines the feature of many beasts in one body: head of a tiger, body of a  loong dragon, tail of a lion, one horn, ears like a dog and foot like a qilin.

Legend

Legend has it that Diting is actually a white dog. In some tales, before Kṣitigarbha left Heaven to assume his new life as a monk, he found that his mother from his past life would be reborn as a dog. Then Ksitigarbha was reincarnated into the human world as Kim Gyo-gak, a prince of Silla. When he grew up, he traced the dog and adopted, which then became his companion.

Kim Gyo-gak had studied in Tang China in his early life. After going back, he decided to give up his life in the royal family to be a monk and then left to Mount Jiuhua with his dog. He became a monk under the Chinese name Dizang "Kṣitigarbha". The dog followed the dharma as well and often acted as Ksitigarbha's guard. When Kṣitigarbha became enlightened, the dog became Diting who guards hell.

In Journey to the West, when Sun Wukong was arguing with the fake Sun Wukong, they went to Diyu to seek help. Ksitigarbha referred the monkeys to his steed Diting, given the latter's ability to differentiate all creatures in the world. Diting was able to distinguish the true monkey, but he knew the fake monkey will wreak havoc in his abode once exposed, so he asked Ksitigarbha to send the duo to Buddha instead.

References 

Chinese legendary creatures
Buddhist legendary creatures
Kṣitigarbha